Glyphodes heliconialis is a moth in the family Crambidae. It was described by Achille Guenée in 1854. It is found in Venezuela, French Guiana and Jamaica.

References

Moths described in 1854
Glyphodes